Gene Mayer returned with John McEnroe to defend the title he had won with Hank Pfister. Top-seeds Mayer and McEnroe defeated No.2 pair Jan Kodeš and Tomáš Šmíd in the final for a prize of $9,200.

Seeds
A champion seed is indicated in bold text while text in italics indicates the round in which that seed was eliminated.

Draw

Finals

Top half

Bottom half

References

External links

U.S. Clay Court Championships
1979 U.S. Clay Court Championships